PhotoGrid is a photo and video editing application for iOS, Android and online editing that enables users to collage photos, enhance pictures, apply tons of materials and make videogrid

History
PhotoGrid APP was released on August 1, 2012, on both Android and  iOS devices. As of 2019, PhotoGrid has over 18.1 million users and been downloaded 258.5 million times. Nearly 80 percent of PhotoGrid's users are under the age of 30, and those younger than 20 are driving most of its growth. Most of PhotoGrid's users live in the United States, following with Brazil, Taiwan and other countries in Asia. With users all over the world, PhotoGrid localizes its operation strategy through providing various materials for regional festivals and all kinds of occasions. Moreover, PhotoGrid is also available in multiple languages for free, including Spanish, German, Russian, Hindi, Korean and Japanese.

In 2017, PhotoGrid had the succession of activities. The collaboration with Krispy Kreme and being authorized to release AR facial filters of Thor, Loki, Hulk and Hela by Marvel.
 
At the end of 2017, PhotoGrid invited popular illustrators to promote the Christmas activity.

In March 2019, PhotoGrid announced the collaborative activity with Cookierun. In PhotoGrid, users could use materials of Cookierun to decorate their pictures for free, and uploaded works to PhotoGrid official account of Facebook to get the chance to win the prize.
   
In September 2021, PhotoGrid is selected as APP of the Day by Apple Store.

PhotoGrid is much more than a collage maker. It also comes with stylish filters and an extensive meme and GIF library. Pretty much everything you want to do with images and text can be done in PhotoGrid. The app is always updating its media catalogue, which you can access with a subscription, along with many other advanced features. Moreover, PhotoGrid now provides online editing service.

References

External links
Official website
Instagram official account
Facebook official account

Photo software
Video editing software